Natale Nobili (19 August 1935 – 10 July 2021) was an Italian professional football player and manager.

Career
Born in Carate Brianza, Nobili played as a goalkeeper for Alessandria, Inter Milan, S.P.A.L. and Pro Vercelli.

He later managed Caratese, Vogherese, Novese and Pro Vercelli.

References

1935 births
2021 deaths
Italian footballers
U.S. Alessandria Calcio 1912 players
Inter Milan players
S.P.A.L. players
F.C. Pro Vercelli 1892 players
Association football goalkeepers
Italian football managers
F.C. Pro Vercelli 1892 managers